Maulasar is a village and block in Didwana tehsil of Nagaur district in Rajasthan.

References

Cities and towns in Nagaur district